Artemisia gorgonum is a species of flowering plants of the family Asteraceae, endemic to Cape Verde. Its local name is losna or lasna. The plant plays a role in traditional medicine.

Description
Artemisia gorgonum is an aromatic shrub that can reach 2 metres. It has small yellow flowers.

Distribution and ecology
Artemisia gorgonum occurs in the islands of Santo Antão, Santiago and Fogo, in semi-arid, subhumid and humid zones. It grows mainly on plains and stony slopes. The main altitudinal distribution is between 800 m and 2000 m.

References

gorgonum
Endemic flora of Cape Verde
Flora of Santo Antão, Cape Verde
Flora of Santiago, Cape Verde
Flora of Fogo, Cape Verde